Saint-Loup-de-Varennes (literally Saint-Loup of Varennes) is a commune in the Saône-et-Loire department in the region of Bourgogne-Franche-Comté in eastern France.

Geography

Historical significance 

Nicéphore Niépce, the inventor of photography, lived in Saint-Loup-de-Varennes, where he died in 1833.
Most or all of his photographs, including one taken in 1827 and now the oldest known surviving camera photograph, were made at Le Gras, his ancestral family estate in this village.

See also
Communes of the Saône-et-Loire department

References
Niépce website

External links

Communes of Saône-et-Loire